Stanton is a city in Montgomery County, Iowa, United States. The population was 678 at the time of the 2020 census.

Stanton was first settled by Swedish immigrants. Stanton is best known for its two water towers, the tanks of which are painted and shaped like a giant coffee pot and coffee cup (billed as "the largest Swedish coffee pot in the world"). These also allude to the fact that Stanton is the hometown of actress Virginia Christine, best known to television viewers as "Mrs. Olsen" in classic commercials for Folgers.

History

Stanton was laid out in 1870.

Geography

Demographics

2010 census
At the 2010 census there were 689 people in 268 households, including 190 families, in the city. The racial makup of the city was 99.9% White and 0.1% from two or more races. Hispanic or Latino of any race were 0.1%.

Of the 268 households 28.4% had children under the age of 18 living with them, 62.3% were married couples living together, 5.2% had a female householder with no husband present, 3.4% had a male householder with no wife present, and 29.1% were non-families. 25.7% of households were one person and 13.1% were one person aged 65 or older. The average household size was 2.39 and the average family size was 2.84.

The median age was 48.7 years. 21.6% of residents were under the age of 18; 4% were between the ages of 18 and 24; 18.9% were from 25 to 44; 30.1% were from 45 to 64; and 25.3% were 65 or older. The gender makeup of the city was 44.0% male and 56.0% female.

2000 census
At the 2000 census there were 714 people in 271 households, including 188 families, in the city. The racial makup of the city was 98.7% White, 0.6% Native American, 0.1% Asian, 0.3% from other races, and 0.3% from two or more races. Hispanic or Latino of any race were 0.6%.

Of the 271 households 35.4% had children under the age of 18 living with them, 62.0% were married couples living together, 4.8% had a female householder with no husband present, and 30.3% were non-families. 28.0% of households were one person and 15.1% were one person aged 65 or older. The average household size was 2.46 and the average family size was 3.01.

26.3% are under the age of 18, 4.5% from 18 to 24, 26.6% from 25 to 44, 19.3% from 45 to 64, and 23.2% 65 or older. The median age was 41 years. For every 100 females, there were 85.5 males. For every 100 females age 18 and over, there were 78.3 males.

The median household income was $36,607 and the median family income was $46,136. Males had a median income of $30,625 versus $20,852 for females. The per capita income for the city was $15,628. About 3.7% of families and 6.1% of the population were below the poverty line, including 4.4% of those under age 18 and 4.2% of those age 65 or over.

Education 
Stanton Community School District operates public schools.

Notable People
 Virginia Christine, film actress, was born in Stanton.
 Joni Ernst, member of the United States Senate

The Little White City 
Stanton is commonly known as the Little White City. Although commonly believed to be in reference to almost everyone painting their house white, the nickname originated from railroad conductors. The town had a small white painted train depot, in contrast to most being plain, brown, treated wood.

References

External links
 Stanton, Iowa homepage

Cities in Montgomery County, Iowa
Swedish-American culture in Iowa
Cities in Iowa